is a prefecture of Japan located in the Chūbu region of Honshu. Gifu Prefecture borders Toyama Prefecture to the north; Ishikawa Prefecture to the northwest, Fukui Prefecture and Shiga Prefecture to the west, Mie Prefecture to the southwest, Aichi Prefecture to the south, and Nagano Prefecture to the east.

Gifu is the capital and largest city of Gifu Prefecture, with other major cities including Ōgaki, Kakamigahara, and Tajimi.

Gifu Prefecture is located in the center of Japan, one of only eight landlocked prefectures, and features the country's center of population. Gifu Prefecture has served as the historic crossroads of Japan with routes connecting the east to the west, including the Nakasendō, one of the Five Routes of the Edo period. Gifu Prefecture was a long-term residence of Oda Nobunaga and Saitō Dōsan, two influential figures of Japanese history in the Sengoku period, spawning the popular phrase "control Gifu and you control Japan" in the late Medieval era. Gifu Prefecture is known for its traditional Washi paper industry, including Gifu lanterns and Gifu umbrellas, and as a center for the Japanese swordsmithing and cutlery industries. Gifu Prefecture is home to Gifu Castle, the 1,300-year-old tradition of Cormorant fishing on the Nagara River, and the site of the Battle of Sekigahara.

History 

The land area that makes up modern-day Gifu became part of the Yamato Court around the middle of the fourth century. Because it is in the middle of the island of Honshu, it has been the site of many decisive battles throughout Japan's history, the oldest major one being the Jinshin War in 672, which led to the establishment of Emperor Tenmu as the 40th emperor of Japan.

The area of Gifu Prefecture consists of the old provinces of Hida and Mino, as well as smaller parts of Echizen and Shinano. The name of the prefecture derives from its capital city, Gifu, which was named by Oda Nobunaga during his campaign to unify all of Japan in 1567. The first character used comes from Qishan (岐山), a legendary mountain from which most of China was unified, whereas the second character comes from Qufu (曲阜), the birthplace of Confucius. Nobunaga chose those characters because he wanted to unify all of Japan and he wanted to be viewed as a great mind.

Historically, the prefecture served as the center of swordmaking for the whole of Japan, with Seki being known for making the best swords in Japan. More recently, its strengths have been in fashion (primarily in the city of Gifu) and aerospace engineering (Kakamigahara).

On October 28, 1891, the present-day city of Motosu was the epicenter for the Mino–Owari earthquake, the second largest earthquake to ever hit Japan. The earthquake, estimated at 8.0 (surface-wave magnitude), left a fault scarp that can still be seen today.

Geography 
One of the few landlocked prefectures in Japan, Gifu shares borders with seven other prefectures: Toyama, Ishikawa, Fukui, Shiga, Mie, Aichi, and Nagano. Japan's postal codes all start with a three-digit number, ranging from 001 to 999. Part of Gifu has the 500 prefix, reflecting its location in the center of Japan.
The center of Japanese population is currently located in Seki City, Gifu Prefecture. The center of population is a hypothetical point at which a country is perfectly balanced assuming each person has a uniform weight. The spot was calculated using the 2005 census.

 18 percent of the total land area of the prefecture was designated as Natural Parks, namely the Hakusan and Chūbu-Sangaku National Parks, Hida-Kisogawa and Ibi-Sekigahara-Yōrō Quasi-National Parks, and fifteen Prefectural Natural Parks.

Regions
Gifu has five unofficial regions, which allows local municipalities to work together to promote the surrounding area. The five regions are Seinō, Gifu, Chūnō, Tōnō and Hida. The borders of the regions are loosely defined, but they are usually delineated among major cities.

Topography
The northern Hida region is dominated by tall mountains, including parts of the Japanese Alps. The southern Mino region is mostly parts of the fertile Nōbi Plain, a vast plains area with arable soil. Most of the prefecture's population lives in the southern part of the prefecture, near the designated city of Nagoya.

The mountainous Hida region contains the Hida Mountains, which are referred to as the "Northern Alps" in Japan. The Ryōhaku Mountains are also in the Hida region. Other major ranges include the Ibuki Mountains and the Yōrō Mountains.

Much of the Mino region is made up of the alluvial plain of the Kiso Three Rivers, which are the Kiso River, Nagara River and Ibi River. The sources of Kiso river is in Nagano prefecture, and those of the others are in Gifu prefecture. They eventually run through Aichi and Mie prefectures before emptying into Ise Bay. Other major rivers in the prefecture include the Miya, Takahara, Shō, Toki (Shōnai), Yahagi, and Itoshiro rivers.

Climate 

Gifu's climate varies from humid subtropical climate in the south, eventually making the transition to humid continental climate in the north.

Because the Mino region is surrounded by low mountains, the temperature fluctuates through the year, from hot summers to cold winters. The eastern city of Tajimi, for example, often records the hottest temperature in Japan each year and is considered to be the hottest city within Honshu boasting an average daytime high of  during the peak of summer. On August 16, 2007, Tajimi set the record for the hottest day recorded in Japan's history—. Summers are hotter, as the landlocked area becomes a heat island, and the temperature rises even further when hot, dry foehn winds blow over the Ibuki Mountains from the Kansai region. The Hida region, with its higher elevation and northerly latitude, is significantly cooler than the Mino region, although there are sometimes extremely hot days there too. The Hida region is more famous for its harsh winters, bringing extremely heavy snowfall, especially in the northwestern areas. Gifu boasts a high amount of skiing locations. Shōkawa-chō, part of the city of Takayama, is up in the mountains, and its location has led it to be called the coldest inhabited place on Honshū.

Municipalities

All of the cities, towns, villages and districts of Gifu Prefecture are listed below.

Cities
Twenty-one cities are located in Gifu Prefecture:

Gifu – (the capital city of the prefecture)

Ena
Gero
Gujō
Hashima
Hida
Kaizu
Kakamigahara
Kani
Mino
Minokamo
Mizuho
Mizunami
Motosu
Nakatsugawa
Ōgaki
Seki
Tajimi
Takayama
Toki
Yamagata

Towns and villages

These are the towns and villages in each district:

Anpachi District
Anpachi
Gōdo
Wanouchi
Fuwa District
Sekigahara
Tarui
Hashima District
Ginan
Kasamatsu
Ibi District
Ibigawa
Ikeda
Ōno
Kamo District
Hichisō
Higashishirakawa
Kawabe
Sakahogi
Shirakawa
Tomika
Yaotsu
Kani District
Mitake
Motosu District
Kitagata
Ōno District
Shirakawa
Yōrō District
Yōrō

Mergers

Economy 
Traditional industries such as paper-making and agriculture are found in Gifu, but its economy is dominated by the manufacturing sector including aerospace and automotive, with industrial complexes extending from the Nagoya area. A wealth of small component manufacturing is also found, such as precision machines, dye and mold making, and plastic forming.

Traditional industries

Gifu is famous for cormorant fishing, which has a history of over 1,300 years. Agriculture is also a major industry because of Gifu's vast, arable plains. The forests in the north provide materials for woodworking and for the viewing boats used in cormorant fishing.

The Mino region has long been known for its high-quality paper called Mino washi, which is stronger and thinner than most other papers in Japan, and was used by the Japanese military during World War II. Other paper-based products include Gifu Lanterns and Gifu Umbrellas, made in the prefectural capital of Gifu. Other traditional goods include mino-yaki pottery in Tajimi, Toki, and Mizunami, cutlery in Seki, and lacquerware in Takayama. Sake is often brewed with clear water from the rivers.

Modern industries
Kakamigahara has a large role in the prefecture's modern industries. It boasts large aerospace facilities of both Kawasaki Heavy Industries and Mitsubishi Heavy Industries, as well as many metalworking and manufacturing companies.

Information technology (IT) is gaining a foothold in the prefecture with both Softopia Japan in Ōgaki and VR Techno Japan (part of Techno Plaza) in Kakamigahara. The capital city of Gifu, located between Ōgaki and Kakamigahara, is also working to strengthen its IT fields, too.

Tourism

Gifu has many popular tourist attractions, bringing visitors to all parts of the prefecture. The most popular places are Gifu, Gero, Shirakawa and Takayama. Gero is known for its relaxing hot springs, which attract visitors throughout the year. Shirakawa's historic villages are a UNESCO World Heritage Site. Takayama is famous for retaining its original appearance and is often referred to as Little Kyoto.

In addition to international tourists, Gifu also plays host to many international events. The World Event and Convention Complex Gifu is available for many types of events. Other areas of Gifu, too, bring international events. The World Rowing Championships were held in the city of Kaizu in 2005. The FIS Snowboard World Cup was held in the city of Gujo in 2008. The APEC Japan 2010 SME Ministerial Meetings were held in Gifu City.

Science
The Kamioka area of the city of Hida is home to the Kamioka Observatory underground laboratory. Located  underground in Kamioka Mining and Smelting Co.'s Mozumi Mine, the Super-Kamiokande experiment searches for neutrinos from the high atmosphere, the sun and supernovae, while the KamLAND experiment searches for antineutrinos from regional nuclear reactors. Some of the 11,146 photomultiplier tubes are on display at the Miraikan in Tokyo. The same facility also hosts the CLIO prototype and KAGRA gravitational wave detector.

Demographics 

The prefecture's population was 2,101,969,  with approximately 1.8 million people in the cities and the rest in towns and villages. The percentage of male and female residents is 48.4% and 51.6%, respectively. 14.4% of the population is no more than 14 years old, with 22.1% of the population being at least 65 years old.

According to Japan's census, the country's center of population is located in Gifu Prefecture. In 2000, it was located in the former town of Mugi, which has since merged with Seki. In the most recent census in 2005, the center of population has moved slightly more to the east but is still located within Gifu.

Education 

Asahi University
Chubu Gakuin University
Chukyo Gakuin University
Gifu City Women's College
Gifu College of Nursing
Gifu Keizai University
Gifu Pharmaceutical University
Gifu Shotoku Gakuen University
Gifu University
Gifu University of Medical Science
Gifu Women's University
Institute of Advanced Media Arts and Sciences
Tokai Gakuin University

Transportation

Rail 

JR Central
Tokaido Shinkansen – Gifu-Hashima Station
Tokaido Line
Takayama Line
Chuo Line
Taita Line
Meitetsu
Nagoya Line
Kakamigahara Line
Hashima Line
Takehana Line
Hiromi Line
Inuyama Line
Yoro Railway
Nagaragawa Railway
Tarumi Railway
Akechi Railway

Road

Expressway and toll roads

Meishin Expressway
Chuo Expressway
Tokai Hokuriku Expressway
Tokai Loop Expressway
Chubu Jukan Expressway
Hakusan Forest Road
Mount Ibuki Toll Road
Nagaragawa Riversideway

National highways

 Route 19
 Route 21
 Route 22
 Route 41
 Route 156
 Route 157
 Route 158
 Route 248
 Route 256
 Route 257
 Route 258
 Route 303
 Route 360
 Route 361
 Route 363
 Route 365
 Route 417
 Route 418
 Route 419
 Route 471
 Route 472
 Route 475

Prefectural symbols 

Gifu's symbol comes from the first character gi (岐) of its Japanese name, written in a stylized script, surrounded by a circle, which represents the peace and harmony of the prefectural citizen. It was chosen by contest in 1932.

The prefectural logo (see right) expands from the red dot into the center to the outer two lines and, finally, the yellow plain. This symbol was chosen in 1991 for the development and expansion of the prefecture.

The prefecture also has two plants (the milk vetch and the Japanese yew) and two animals (the snow grouse and the ayu) as symbols. The milk vetch was chosen in 1954, because the prefecture is well known for its abundance of blooming milk vetch each spring. The yew was chosen in 1966, because it is the tree used to make ornamental scepters for the emperor, many of which came from the Hida district. The snow grouse was chosen in 1961, as the birds live up in the Japanese alps and is a nationally protected species. Ayu were chosen in 1989, because the fish is found in many prefectural rivers and is prized for its sweet taste.

Notable people
 Chie Aoki, sculptor
 Chiune Sugihara, diplomat
 Junji Ito, manga artist 
 Kaiu Shirai, manga artist 
 Tsuyoshi Makino, author and social activist
 Teiji Takagi, mathematician

See also
Solar Ark, a solar energy project located in Gifu Prefecture

Notes

References
 Nussbaum, Louis-Frédéric and Käthe Roth (2005).  Japan Encyclopedia. Cambridge, Massachusetts: Harvard University Press. ; . .

External links 

  
Gifu travel guide 
Go Gifu (blog about tourism in Gifu) 
Map of Gifu Prefecture in 1891. National Archives of Japan.

 
Chūbu region
Prefectures of Japan